Fendall Hall, also known as the Young–Dent Home, is an Italianate-style historic house museum in Eufaula, Alabama.  The two-story wood-frame structure, with a symmetrical villa-type floor-plan and crowning cupola, was built between 1856 and 1860 by Edward Brown Young and his wife, Ann Fendall Beall.  It remained in the Young family for five generations, passing to the builders’ daughter, Anna Beall Young, and her husband, Stouten Hubert Dent in 1879.   It was added to the National Register of Historic Places on July 28, 1970.  The  Alabama Historical Commission acquired it in 1973 and restored it to an appearance appropriate to a time-frame spanning 1880–1916.

Edward Brown Young, a native of New York City, married Ann Fendall Beall of Warren County, Georgia.  The couple moved to Eufaula in 1837, where he engaged in banking and entrepreneurial endeavors.  Young is credited with sponsoring the change of the town name from Irwinton to its original Muscogee name, Eufaula.

See also
National Register of Historic Places listings in Barbour County, Alabama

References

External links
 Fendall Hall - official site at Alabama Historic Commission

National Register of Historic Places in Barbour County, Alabama
Houses on the National Register of Historic Places in Alabama
Italianate architecture in Alabama
Houses completed in 1860
Historic house museums in Alabama
Museums in Barbour County, Alabama
Alabama State Historic Sites
Houses in Barbour County, Alabama